The Equaesi were an ancient Celtic tribe of Gallaecia, who lived in the north of modern Portugal, between the provinces of Minho and Trás-os-Montes, near the border of modern Galicia (Spain).

See also
Pre-Roman peoples of the Iberian Peninsula

External links
Detailed map of the Pre-Roman Peoples of Iberia (around 200 BC)

Tribes of Gallaecia
Galician Celtic tribes
Ancient peoples of Portugal